Eiger Dreams: Ventures Among Men and Mountains is a non-fiction collection of articles and essays by Jon Krakauer on mountaineering and rock climbing. Eleven out of twelve of the chapters were initially published between 1982 and 1989 in the magazines Outside, Smithsonian, and New Age Journal.

Overview
It concerns a variety of topics, from ascending the Eiger Nordwand in the Swiss Alps, Denali in Alaska or K2 in the Karakoram, to the well-known rock climbers Jon Krakauer has met on his trips, such as John Gill, Adrian Popovich  or the Burgess brothers

Chapters of the book  
 "Eiger Dreams"
 "Gill"
 "Valdez Ice"
 "On Being Tentbound"
 "The Flyboys of Talkeetna"
 "Club Denali"
 "Chamonix"
 "Canyoneering"
 "A Mountain Higher Than Everest?"
 "The Burgess Boys"
 "A Bad Summer on K2"
 "The Devils Thumb"

Bibliography
 Eiger Dreams: Ventures Among Men and Mountains (1990) 

Mountaineering books
1990 non-fiction books
Eiger
Essay collections
Lyons Press books